The SIG Sauer SSG 2000 (Scharfschützengewehr 2000, literally Sharpshooter Rifle 2000) is a bolt-action, magazine-fed rifle.

Service use
The SSG 2000 sniper rifle is a joint effort by Swiss company SIG Arms (now SIG Sauer AG) and German company J.P.Sauer & Sohn. Production of the SSG 2000 started in 1989. In 1992, it was succeeded by the SSG 3000, although both models were produced concurrently for a period.

Description
The SSG 2000 is derived from the Sauer 80/90 target rifle. It has a bolt action with rotating handle, but non-rotating bolt. When the handle is rotated to close the action, six lugs are driven onwards from the rear part of the bolt body to lock into the receiver. The action also features a loaded chamber indicator. The heavy barrel is hammer-forged and has a flash hider/muzzle brake unit installed. The wooden stock is adjustable. The trigger is two-stage.

The SSG 2000 has no iron sights by default and is usually fitted with Schmidt & Bender X1.5-6×42 variable-power or Zeiss Diatal ZA 8×56T fixed-power telescope sight.

Users

See also 
 Sauer 80
 SIG Sauer SSG 3000

References

7.5×55mm Swiss firearms
7.62×51mm NATO rifles
Sniper rifles of Switzerland
Bolt-action rifles
Post–Cold War weapons of Germany
SIG Sauer rifles
Weapons and ammunition introduced in 1989